Simi Garewal (born Simrita Garewal;  17 October 1947) is an Indian actress, director, producer and a talk show host, who has been known for her special love for white sarees. She is the recipient of two Filmfare awards and an ITA Award. She is known for her work in Hindi films like Do Badan, Saathi, Mera Naam Joker, Siddhartha, Karz and Udeekaan (Punjabi film). She acted in the Bengali movie Aranyer Din Ratri directed by Satyajit Ray. She is also known for her celebrity talk show, Rendezvous with Simi Garewal.

Early life
Garewal was born in Delhi. Her father, Brigadier J. S. Garewal served in the Indian Army. Simi is a cousin of Pamela Chopra, wife of film-maker Yash Chopra. Simi's mother Darshi and Pamela's father Mohinder Singh were siblings. Simi grew up in England and studied at Newland House School with her sister Amrita.

Film and television career
After spending much of her childhood in England, Garewal returned to India while a teenager. Her fluency in the English language induced the makers of the English-language film Tarzan Goes to India to offer her a role. A 15-year-old, Garewal made her debut alongside Feroz Khan in this film in 1962. Her performance was good enough for her to fetch many more film offers. During the 1960s and '70s, she was in several notable Indian films, working with leading directors such as Mehboob Khan's Son of India, Raj Kapoor in Mera Naam Joker (1970), Satyajit Ray in Aranyer Din Ratri (Days and Nights in the Forest), Mrinal Sen in Padatik (The Guerilla Fighter) and Raj Khosla in Do Badan. She starred opposite Shashi Kapoor in Columbia Pictures' Siddhartha, an English-language movie based on the novel by Hermann Hesse. Garewal did a nude scene in this film which caused some controversy in India and was only released for exhibition after complying with cuts ordered by the Indian Censor board. Later, in the mid-1970s, she made an appearance in the popular film Kabhi Kabhie (1976), made by her brother in-law Yash Chopra, and had a starring role in Chalte Chalte (1976). Another notable role she played was as a vamp in Karz (1980). She starred in the BBC docu-drama Maharajas (1987), based on the book by Charles Allen.

In the early 1980s, her attention turned to writing and direction. She formed her own production company, Siga Arts International. She hosted, produced and directed a TV series for Doordarshan called It's a Woman's World (1983). She also made a documentary for Channel 4 in the UK called Living Legend Raj Kapoor (1984). This was followed by a three-part documentary on Rajiv Gandhi titled India's Rajiv. She wrote and directed a Hindi feature film Rukhsat and produced television commercials, for which she won the first prize from the 1988 Pater's Award in Australia. 

Garewal anchored the talk show Rendezvous with Simi Garewal.

She usually wears her signature white clothes on TV shows and at award ceremonies, and is popularly known as "The Lady in White".  Garewal recently appeared on Say Shava Shava 2008 as a host and judge. After the Mumbai terrorist attacks of November 2008, Simi Garewal aroused controversy by publicly calling for the Indian government to "carpet-bomb" the training camps in Pakistan.

She returned to television with her new talk show India's Most Desirable on Star Plus which would interview only eligible singles, Bollywood actors, business and media icons, and Indian cricketers about their "ideal and desirable beaus".

Simi Garewal has her own website which she uses to interact with her fans. The site has her voice reading the text. She also has her own channel on YouTube where all her shows and documentaries are uploaded. The channel has received over 40 million views.

Personal life
Garewal had her first serious relationship at the age of 17, with then Maharaja of Jamnagar, who was also her neighbour in England.

Garewal was later in a relationship and going steady with Mansoor Ali Khan Pataudi but he broke up with her after he met Sharmila Tagore.

Filmography

As an actress

Television

Awards and nominations

 1966–Filmfare Award for Best Supporting Actress – Do Badan
 1968–Filmfare Award for Best Supporting Actress – Saathi
 1980–Filmfare Nomination as Best Supporting Actress – Karz
 1999–Screen Awards for Best Talk Show & Best Anchor
 2001–RAPA Award for Best Anchor & Talk show
 2003–Indian Television Academy Award for Best Anchor
 2003–Rotary Award for Vocational Excellence in Media & Television
 2004–Indian Filmgoers Association Award Best Talk Show

References

External links

Simi Garewal's Official YouTube Channel, of Siga Arts International
Simi Garewal: the icon of style
Bollywood501 portrait
 
Kesavan, Mukul. "The Mumbai tragedy and the English language news media", The Telegraph, 4 December 2008.

20th-century Indian actresses
Indian women film directors
Actresses in Hindi cinema
1947 births
Living people
Indian television talk show hosts
Indian Sikhs
People educated at Newland House School
Punjabi people
Actresses from Delhi
Indian women television presenters
Indian women television directors
Indian women television writers
Indian television writers
Filmfare Awards winners